The Tarab Formation is a geologic formation in the Wadi al Shatii District, western Libya. The lacustrine limestones preserve fossils dating back to the Rupelian stage of the Oligocene period.

Fossil content 
The formation has provided the following fossils:
Mammals
 Pliohyracidae
 Saghatherium antiquum
Amphibians
 Anura indet.
Fish
 Osteichthyes indet.

See also 

 Mizdah Formation, Late Cretaceous fossiliferous formation of Libya
 Jebel Qatrani Formation, contemporaneous fossiliferous formation of Egypt
 Quercy Phosphorites Formation, contemporaneous fossiliferous formation of France
 Indricotherium Formation, contemporaneous fossiliferous formation of Kazakhstan

References

Bibliography 
 

Geologic formations of Libya
Oligocene Series of Africa
Rupelian Stage
Limestone formations
Lacustrine deposits
Fossiliferous stratigraphic units of Africa
Paleontology in Libya
Formations